Road Trips Volume 1 Number 3 is a two-CD live album by the American rock band the Grateful Dead.  The third in their "Road Trips" series of albums, it was released on June 9, 2008.  The first disc was recorded on July 31, 1971, at the Yale Bowl in New Haven, Connecticut, and the second disc was recorded on August 23, 1971, at the Auditorium Theatre in Chicago, Illinois.

A third, "bonus" disc was included with early shipments of the album.  The bonus disc contains additional concert material from the summer of 1971.

Another live Grateful Dead album recorded during this same concert tour (including more of the August 6, 1971 show of the bonus disc) is Dick's Picks Volume 35.

Track listing

Disc One

Yale Bowl, New Haven, Connecticut, July 31, 1971:
"Big Railroad Blues" (Noah Lewis) – 4:46
"Hard to Handle" (Otis Redding, Al Bell, Allen Jones) – 7:54
"Me and Bobby McGee" (Kris Kristofferson, Fred Foster) – 6:22
"Dark Star" > (Jerry Garcia, Mickey Hart, Bill Kreutzmann, Phil Lesh, Ron "Pigpen" McKernan, Bob Weir, Robert Hunter) – 22:48
"Bird Song" (Garcia, Hunter) – 7:59
"Not Fade Away" > (Buddy Holly, Norman Petty) – 4:44
"Goin' Down the Road Feeling Bad" > (traditional, arranged by Grateful Dead) – 9:24
"Not Fade Away" (Holly, Petty) – 3:13
"Uncle John's Band" > (Garia, Hunter) – 6:39
"Johnny B. Goode" (Chuck Berry) – 3:52

Disc Two

Auditorium Theatre, Chicago, Illinois, August 23, 1971:
"China Cat Sunflower" > (Garcia, Hunter) – 5:09
"I Know You Rider" (traditional, arranged by Grateful Dead) – 6:02
"Truckin'" (Garcia, Lesh, Weir, Hunter) – 8:51
"Sugaree" (Garcia, Hunter) – 7:11
"Cryptical Envelopment" > (Garcia) – 2:02
"Drums" > (Kreutzmann) – 4:26
"The Other One" > (Weir, Kreutzmann) – 13:00
"Me and My Uncle" > (John Phillips) – 3:04
"The Other One" > (Weir, Kreutzmann) – 7:32
"Cryptical Envelopment" >(Garcia) – 5:14
"Wharf Rat" > (Garcia, Hunter) – 8:53
"Sugar Magnolia" (Weir, Hunter) – 5:46

Bonus Disc
Hollywood Palladium, Hollywood, California, August 6, 1971:

Yale Bowl, New Haven, Connecticut, July 31, 1971:

Terminal Island Correctional Facility, San Pedro, California, August 4, 1971:

Personnel

Grateful Dead

 Jerry Garcia – lead guitar, vocals
 Bill Kreutzmann – drums
 Phil Lesh – electric bass, vocals
 Ron "Pigpen" McKernan – organ, percussion, vocals
 Bob Weir – rhythm guitar, vocals

Production

Produced by Grateful Dead
Compilation produced by David Lemieux and Blair Jackson
Recorded by Rex Jackson
Edited and mastered by Jeffrey Norman at Garage Audio Mastering
Cover art by Scott McDougall
Package design by Steve Vance
Liner notes written by Blair Jackson

Sound quality

The album was released in HDCD format.  This provides enhanced sound quality when played on CD players with HDCD capability, and is fully compatible with regular CD players.

Recording dates

Road Trips Volume 1 Number 3 contains selections from the following concerts:

July 31, 1971 — Yale Bowl, New Haven, Connecticut
August 4, 1971 — Terminal Island Correctional Facility, San Pedro, California
August 6, 1971 — Hollywood Palladium, Hollywood, California
August 23, 1971 — Auditorium Theatre, Chicago, Illinois

References

Road Trips albums
2008 live albums